Yaw Bampoh  is a Ghanaian politician and a member of the first Parliament of the fourth Republic representing the Atwima Nwabiagya constituency in the Ashanti region of Ghana.

Early life and education 
Yaw Bampoh was born in 1955 at Abuakwa in the Ashanti Region of Ghana.
He attended the Mpasatia L. A. Middle School. He also attended the Sefwi Wiawso Training College where he obtained his Teachers' Training Certificate.

Politics 
He was elected into parliament on the ticket of the National Democratic Congress for the Atwima Nwabiagya Constituency during the 1992 Ghanaian parliamentary election. He was defeated by James Edusei Sarkodei of the New Patriotic Party during the 1996 General election. James Edusei  Sarkodie polled 31,088 votes out of the total valid votes cast representing 61.90% while Yaw Bampoh polled 10,598 votes representing 21.10%. Alex Addo Kuffour of the People's National Congress also polled 469 votes representing 0.90%.

Career 
He is a teacher, farmer and a former member of parliament for the Atwima Nwabiagya Constituency who served in parliament from 1993 to 1997. He served one term as the member of parliament for the constituency.

Personal life 
He is a Christian.

References 

Living people
1955 births
Ghanaian MPs 1993–1997
National Democratic Congress (Ghana) politicians
Ghanaian educators
Ghanaian farmers
Ghanaian Christians
People from Ashanti Region